Kalyāṇī Ordination Hall is a Buddhist ordination hall located in Bago, Myanmar. The ordination hall is a major pilgrimage site, and houses the Kalyani Inscriptions, a set of 10 sandstone pillars inscribed in Pali and Mon in 1480. The inscriptions are important records of Theravada Buddhist history and of that era.

History 

The ordination hall was first built by King Dhammazedi of the Hanthawaddy Kingdom in 1476 to re-ordain the kingdom's Buddhist monks, in an effort to purify the kingdom's Sangha, which had undergone several internal schisms. To this end, in 1476, Dhammazedi sent 22 senior monks and their disciples to Sri Lanka, where they were re-ordained at the Kelaniya Raja Maha Vihara. After the monks had returned, Dhammazedi built the Kalyani Ordination Hall, which derives its name from the Kelani River in Sri Lanka. The construction of the first Kalyani Ordination Hall spurred construction of similarly-named Kalyani Ordination Halls; throughout the Hanthawaddy Kingdom, 9 large ones and 107 small ones were constructed.

The ordination hall was destroyed several times. Portuguese explorers burnt the structure in 1599, and King Alaungpaya destroyed the hall during his invasion of Bago in 1757. The ordination hall was also destroyed by fires and earthquakes, including an earthquake in 1930 that levelled the structure completely. The extant ordination hall was reconstructed in 1954.

Notes

References

Bibliography
 

Buddhist temples in Myanmar
Religious buildings and structures completed in 1476